Ezell Jones (born July 11, 1947) is a former American football tackle. 

Jones was born in Collierville, Tennessee, in 1947. He attended Melrose High School in Memphis and played college football at Minnesota.

He was selected by the New York Jets in the fourth round of the 1969 NFL Draft, but was traded to the Boston Patriots in August 1969. He appeared in 18 games for the Patriots during the 1969 and 1970 seasons.

References

1947 births
Living people
American football tackles
Minnesota Golden Gophers football players
Boston Patriots players
Players of American football from Tennessee
People from Collierville, Tennessee